Matheus Correia (14 February 1974 – 25 July 2022), popularly known by his stage name Comedian Selvy, was an Indian comedian, actor, playwright, singer, director and producer from Goa. He predominantly worked on the Konkani stage and is regarded as one of the greatest Konkani comedians of his generation. He was noted mainly for his comedy  performances and was deemed as Goa's most loved comedian.

Early and personal life 

Matheus Correia was born to Goan Catholic parents, José Correia and Joana Batistina Fernandes, on 14 February 1974 in Velim, hailing from Fursabhatt. He was a practising Roman Catholic and was married to Candolina Fernandes, with whom he had two sons, Myron Correia and Ryan Correia.

Career

Tiatrs 

Selvy always had an immense love of, and keen interest in, the Konkani stage. He began acting at the age of 8 in his elder brother, Saúde Correia's tiatrs and village folk plays. Selvy was also active in traditional Carnival folk plays (Konkani: Zomnivhele khell) before becoming a full-time professional tiatrist. He was first discovered by Tony Park who noted his skills in comedy and cast him for his non-stop tiatr. Selvy had previously worked in the water resources department of the Goa Government before getting his big break at age 24 in 1998 as a professional comedian in John D'Silva's tiatr "Vatt" (Way).

During his career span of 40 years as a Konkani actor, Selvy has acted in more than 60 tiatrs and was cast by prominent Konkani directors such as John D'Silva (14–15 tiatrs), Agostinho Themudo (23 tiatrs) from 2007 to 2019, beginning from the tiatr "Sir" to signing off in "Pai" (Father)  and Roseferns (20 tiatrs) in the late 1990s, 2000s and 2010s. He was also cast by other notable Goan Tiatr directors like Mario Menezes, Comedian Sally, C'D Silva, Pascoal Rodrigues and Milagres de Chandor. Joyel Fernandes, popularly known as Comedian Joyel, an emerging Konkani comedian from Maina-Curtorim also recalls that Selvy was his inspiration to take up the comedy genre.

VCDs and CDs 
Selvy was also featured in more than 200 VCDs. He produced 5 of them namely, "Bekar Louddi", "Second Hand", "Garbage" and "Wrong Number". He was also known for his singing skills, and has sung in about 25 CDs. After attaining much success in his Tiatr career, Selvy went on a global tour with his troupe in places like United Kingdom, Paris, The Middle East to perform for his audience.

Directoral debut and films 
Selvy eventually started writing, producing and directing his own tiatrs. "Raza Jeita Kombo Choita" and "8 Dis" (8 Days) remain his only and most popular productions till date, which resulted in a tremendous positive response from the Goan diaspora in the United Kingdom. The latter also crossed the silver jubilee mark prior to his death and was on the way towards the golden jubilee with a scheduled show in London in late July. 

Selvy was also known for his role of Mad Man in the 2018 movie, Welcome M1LL10NS. He is also seen acting in his last Konkani film, "Rong" (Colour) directed by Aggi Rod and produced by Joywin Fernandes, which was posthumously released on YouTube on 24 August 2022.

Awards

Selvy was honoured by the "Gulab Award" in 2007 and "Dr. Jack de Sequeira Memorial Award" for his contributions towards the Konkani stage. He was also a recipient of the "Yuva Srujan Puraskar" award from the Arts and Culture Department of the Goa Government for the year 2011–2012.

Filmography

Tiatrs

Films

Death 
Selvy complained to his troupe about uneasiness and toothache while performing in his Tiatr, "8 Dis" (8 days). On 15 July 2022, he visited the South Goa District Hospital in Margao for a checkup during which he was informed by the examining specialist that his diabetes and haemoglobin levels were showing negative signs.

He was moved swiftly to Goa Medical College and was admitted on 16 July 2022. Selvy's elder son, Myron Correia, informed the media that his father's diabetes was under control but the blood platelet count was still low.

He later was shifted to the intensive care unit of the hospital, wherein he received many telephone calls from his loved ones. Several Goans also offered to donate blood to save his life after many blood donation requests were made. However on 25 July 2022, Selvy unexpectedly died at the age of 48, due to diabetes-related complications.

Reactions 
The Chief Minister of Goa, Pramod Sawant and several other political leaders gave their condolences to the bereaved family.

Funeral 
Selvy's funeral was held on 27 July 2022 at St. Francis Xavier Church, Velim. It was attended by tens of thousands of Goans, including his family, friends, Tiatr fraternity and political leaders. He was later laid to rest at St. Francis Xavier Church cemetery in Velim.

Aftermath
On July 31 2022, Selvy's tiatr "8 Dis" (8 Days) was staged on public request and also as a fulfilment to the late comedian's wish. Myron,  Selvy's elder son also added, that prior to his father's death, Selvy wanted the doctors to discharge him so that he could perform for the show. Hundreds of tiatr lovers were spotted to pay their tributes at Ravindra Bhavan in Margao. A one minute silence was observed to pay respect for the late comedian.

See also 
List of notable people from Velim
List of people from Goa
List of Tiatrists

References

External links 
 
 Comedian Selvy at Tiatr.in 
 Comedian Selvy Funeral Service

1974 births
2022 deaths
Indian male comedians
Indian male actors
Tiatrists
Goan Catholics
Indian producers
Indian directors
Indian male singers
Konkani people
Dramatists and playwrights from Goa
People from South Goa district
People from Goa
21st-century Indian people
Goan people